The 1950–51 Oklahoma A&M Aggies men's basketball team represented Oklahoma A&M College, now known as Oklahoma State University, in NCAA competition in the 1950–51 season.

NCAA tournament
West
 Oklahoma A&M 50, Montana State 46
 Oklahoma A&M 61, Washington 57
Final Four
 Kansas State 68, Oklahoma A&M 44
Third Place Game
 Illinois 61, Oklahoma A&M 46

Rankings

Awards and honors

Team players drafted into the NBA

References

Oklahoma State Cowboys basketball seasons
Oklahoma AandM
Oklahoma AandM
NCAA Division I men's basketball tournament Final Four seasons
Oklahoma State
Oklahoma State